Ousseynou Thioune (born 16 November 1993) is a Senegalese international footballer who plays as a defensive midfielder for French  club Dijon.

Club career
Born in Dakar, Thioune started his career with Diambars. He took part of the club's Ligue 2 winning campaign in 2011, as well in their Premier League and League Cup accolades in 2013 and 2016, respectively.

Thioune joined Botola's Ittihad Tanger in August 2016. He made his professional debut late in the month, stating in a 4–1 home routing of Difaa El Jadida. He was among the squad during the 2017–18 season which was crowned champions for the first time ever.

On 18 December 2018, Thioune agreed to a six-month contract with Segunda División side Gimnàstic de Tarragona.

In July 2019 he signed for French club Sochaux.

On 15 July 2022, Thioune signed a two-year contract with Dijon.

International career
Thioune made his full international debut for Senegal on 31 May 2014, coming on as a second-half substitute for Dame Diop in a 2–2 friendly draw against Colombia at the Estadio Pedro Bidegain in Buenos Aires, Argentina. Called up by the under-23 side for the 2015 Africa U-23 Cup of Nations held in his homeland, he was an undisputed starter until the semifinals, when he was sent off for handballing inside the box in a match against Nigeria; the visitors won the match 1–0.

Personal life
Thioune's elder brother Mame Saher is also a footballer. A central defender, both played together at Ittihad Tanger in 2017.

Career statistics

Club

International

Honours

Club
Diambars
Senegal Premier League: 2013
Senegalese Super Cup: 2011, 2012, 2013
Senegalese League Cup: 2016
Senegal Ligue 2: 2011

Ittihad Tanger
Botola: 2017–18

International
Senegal U23
African Games: 2015

References

External links

1993 births
Living people
Footballers from Dakar
Senegalese footballers
Association football midfielders
Diambars FC players
Botola players
Ittihad Tanger players
Segunda División players
Gimnàstic de Tarragona footballers
FC Sochaux-Montbéliard players
Dijon FCO players
Ligue 2 players
2015 Africa U-23 Cup of Nations players
Competitors at the 2015 African Games
African Games gold medalists for Senegal
African Games medalists in football
Senegal international footballers
Senegalese expatriate footballers
Senegalese expatriate sportspeople in Morocco
Senegalese expatriate sportspeople in Spain
Expatriate footballers in Morocco
Expatriate footballers in Spain
Senegalese expatriate sportspeople in France
Expatriate footballers in France